The 2009 Internazionali di Tennis dell'Umbria was a professional tennis tournament played on outdoor red clay courts. It was the third edition of the tournament which was part of the 2009 ATP Challenger Tour. It took place in Todi, Italy between 14 and 20 September 2009.

ATP entrants

Seeds

 Rankings are as of August 31, 2009.

Other entrants
The following players received wildcards into the singles main draw:
  Francesco Aldi
  Andrea Arnaboldi
  Stefano Galvani
  Giancarlo Petrazzuolo

The following players received a Special Exempt into the singles main draw:
  Carlos Berlocq

The following players received entry from the qualifying draw:
  Thomas Fabbiano (as a Lucky Loser)
  David Goffin
  Andrey Kuznetsov
  Boris Pašanski
  Adrian Ungur

Champions

Singles

 Simon Greul def.  Adrian Ungur, 2–6, 6–1, 7–6(6)

Doubles

 Martin Fischer /  Philipp Oswald def.  Pablo Santos /  Gabriel Trujillo-Soler, 7–5, 6–3

External links
Official site
ITF Search 

Internazionali di Tennis dell'Umbria
Clay court tennis tournaments
Internazionali di Tennis Città dell'Aquila
2009 in Italian tennis